Geneviève Serreau (15 August 1915 in Oléron – 2 October 1981) was a 20th-century French stage actress and playwright.

Geneviève Serreau made her debut as a comedian before she devoted herself with Benno Besson to the translation into French of several works by German playwright Bertolt Brecht, including Mother Courage and Her Children. She also authored Histoire du nouveau théâtre. She realized numerous mises en scène and stage adaptations, including that of The Sea Wall by Marguerite Duras.

Geneviève Serreau was married to theatre director Jean-Marie Serreau with whom she had three children: Dominique Serreau, Coline Serreau and Nicolas Serreau.

Plays 
Serreau wrote the following plays from 1946 to 1971.
1946: Le Marchand d'étoiles, directed by Jean-Marie Serreau, Théâtre des Bouffes du Nord
1955: Le soldat Bourquin
1959: Le fondateur
1960: The Sea Wall by Marguerite Duras, directed by Jean-Marie Serreau, Studio des Champs-Élysées
1962: Ressac
1968: Bertolt Brecht dramaturge
1971: L'Escalier de Silas, directed by Michel Peyrelon, Théâtre du Vieux-Colombier

References

External links 
 Geneviève Serreau on Encyclopedia Universalis
 Geneviève Serreau on Babelio
 Geneviève Serreau on Gallimard

20th-century French actresses
20th-century French dramatists and playwrights
French women dramatists and playwrights
People from Charente-Maritime
1915 births
1981 deaths
20th-century French women writers